Nadine Merabi (born 19 January 1982) is a British-Lebanese fashion designer.

Early life

Merabi was born in Manchester to an English mother and a Lebanese father. She spent the first 4 years of her life living in Tripoli, Lebanon.

Following 10 years playing hockey for England at an international level, Merabi taught herself how to sew and design through videos online.

Fashion career

She originally started her own fashion label and was later appointed creative director at fashion company ONO UNO. Four seasons later, due to a demand for her signature dresses, she relaunched her MERABI brand.

She has dressed numerous actors and celebrities including Catherine Tyldesly, Michelle Keegan  and Katie Piper. Her designs have been worn on the red carpet events including the National Television Awards, Cannes Film Festival, and the BAFTAS. Her designs are known for their timeless and elegant silhouettes.

In 2016 she was included in the Northern Power Women Top 50 Future List.

References

1982 births
Living people
British fashion designers